Sylvestr may refer to:
Jakub Sylvestr (born 1989), Slovak football player
Sylvester of Kiev (c. 1055 - 1123), clergyman and writer in Kievan Rus